Shikawr is the second studio album by Bangladeshi-Indian singer-songwriter Sahana Bajpaie and Gorki Mukherjee. Samantak Sinha arranged and Saptarshi Routh wrote and composed the songs of this album. It was released in October 2014 by Cozmik Harmony from Kolkata, India.

Track listing

Personnel
 Saptarshi Routh - lyrics, composition, and production
 Samantak Sinha – backing vocals, acoustic guitar, harmonica
 Sunny Bhattacharya – acoustic guitar, bass guitar
 Sabyasachi Dasgupta (Johnny) – electric guitar
 Prasenjit 'Pom' Chakrabutty –	nylon string guitar
 Bunty – drums, percussions
 Subhayu Sen Majumdar – esraj
 Rahul Sarkar – keyboard
 Satyaki Banerjee – rabab and oud
 Ashish Biswas – cello
 Tapas Bhowmick – accordion

References

External links
 
 
 Shikawr at Google Play
 

2014 albums
Bengali-language albums
Sahana Bajpaie albums